The S. B. Withey House is an historic house at 10 Appian Way in Cambridge, Massachusetts.  It is a -story wood-frame Greek Revival house, three bays wide, with a front-facing gable roof and clapboard siding.  Its entrance is recessed in the leftmost bay in an opening flanked by pilasters and topped by a Tudor arch.  The house was built c. 1855–56 by S. B. Withey, and is one of a few residential houses in the Harvard Square area that still stands at its original site.

The house was listed on the National Register of Historic Places in 1986.

See also
National Register of Historic Places listings in Cambridge, Massachusetts

References

Houses on the National Register of Historic Places in Cambridge, Massachusetts